1-(1-Phenylcyclohexyl)-4-hydroxypiperidine (PCHP) is a metabolite of phencyclidine (PCP).  PCHP can be detected in the hair, urine, stool, sweat, and saliva of PCP users.

See also
 4-Phenyl-4-(1-piperidinyl)cyclohexanol, another PCP metabolite

References

Arylcyclohexylamines
Piperidines
Secondary alcohols
Recreational drug metabolites